Top Hit Music Awards is a Russian/Ukrainian annual music awards ceremony established by TopHit in 2013. Russian artists, authors and producers are honored for outstanding achievements in popular music and record business, based on the data of song rotation on air of the radio stations. Ceremonies are held annually in Moscow.

There is a Top Hit Hall of Fame as a part of the award. Every year 10 nominees are announced by partnering radio stations, determined by voting. Then past Hall of Fame members elect 2 of them.

Evaluations 
Yolka singer, one of the most popular Russian singers, honors Top Hit Music Awards as a tool for determining artists by their real statistical popularity, not by decisions of some jury. This also emphasizes professional nature of the award. Yolka was awarded multiple times, including "Artist of the decade award", as Top Hit measurements show that she is extremely popular among Russian-speaking listeners with over 19 million of airplays in 10 years.

TimeOut showbiz magazine coined the ceremony a metaphor of "Unbiased Prize of Numbers which is based exceptionally on statistics and is not subject to objections" .

Nomination structure 
Main awards for singers

 Local Russian artists and groups most played on Russian radio in the past year
 Foreign artists and groups most played on Russian radio in the past year
 Local Russian artists most played at YouTube Russia in the past year
 Foreign artists most played at YouTube Russia in the past year
 Local Russian artists most played at Spotify Russia in the past year
 Foreign artists most played at Spotify Russia in the past year

Other awards for singers (artist of decade, takeoff, breakthrough, comeback and other special nominations).

Nominations for songs

 Russian hits most played on Russian radio over the year
 Foreign hits most played on Russian radio over the year
 Russian hits most played and watched on YouTube Russia over the year
 Foreign hits played and watched on YouTube Russia over the year
 Russian hits most played at Spotify Russia in the past year
 Foreign hits most played at Spotify Russia in the past year

Professional nominations

 Local Russian composers and poets most played on Russian radios during past year
 Local Russian producers whose artists were most played on Russian radios during past year
 Local Russian record labels whose artists were most played on Russian radios during past year
 Foreign record labels whose artists were most played on Russian radios during past year
 Local Russian composers and poets most played and watched on YouTube Russia during past year
 Local music video makers whose music videos were most played on YouTube Russia over the year
 Local record labels whose artists were most played on YouTube Russia over the year

Winners

2013 

Date of ceremony: April 25, 2013, "The Artist" Club, Moscow.

Hosts: Yulia Kovalchuk, Dmitry Koldun, Zaza Napoli, Alexey Ostudin.

Featured musicians: Philipp Kirkorov, Yolka (singer), Gradusy, Eva Polna, Dima Bilan, Vintage (band), Morandi, Irakli, Batishta, Dino MC47, Diskoteka Avariya, Polina Gagarina, 5sta Family, Dominic Joker, Elvira T, Reflex.

Winners of Top Hit Music Awards Russia 2013:

The best male singer on the radio:
 Grigory Leps,

The best female singer on the radio:
 Nyusha
 Yolka (singer)

The best band on the radio:
 Gradusy

Radio Hit of the Year (female vocals)
 "Next to you" (Около тебя) (Yolka)

Radio Hit of the Year (mixed vocals)
 "We are together" (Вместе мы) (5sta Family)
 "Weather forecast" (Прогноз погоды) (Diskoteka Avariya & Kristina Orbakaitė)

Radio Hit of the Year (male vocals)
 "Sweeps" ("Заметает") (Gradusy)

The most ordered song on the radio
 "I don't love you either" ("Я тебя тоже нет") (Eva Polna)

Awards in special nominations

Radio Discovery of the Year
 Elvira T
Radio Breakthrough
 Eva Polna
 DJ Smash
 Dominic Joker

Radio Comeback 
 Polina Gagarina

The longest-playing radio hit
 "Provence" (Прованс) (Yolka (singer))

Professional awards

Authors of the Year:
 Lev Shapiro (for the song "The best day" (Самый лучший день) performed by Grigory Leps)
 Egor Solodovnikov (the author of the songs "Next to you" (Около тебя) and "Provence" (Прованс) performed by Yolka)
 Alexey Romanov (the author of the songs of  Vintage (band))
 Roman Pashkov, Ruslan Tagiyev (authors of the Gradusy band's hits)

Producers of the Year
 Alyona Mikhailova, Liana Meladze (for producing the singer Yolka)
 Oleg Nekrasov (for producing the band Gradusy)
 Denis Sattarov, Irina Shcherbinskaya (for producing the singer Elvira T)

Labels of the Year
 Universal Music Russia
 Warner Music Russia
 Velvet Music

Hall of fame:
 A-Studio
 Alexey Romanov
 Alla Pugacheva
 Valery Meladze
 Dima Bilan
 Eva Polna
 Zemfira
 Konstantin Meladze
 Maxim Fadeev
 Mitya Fomin
 Yuri Aizenshpis (posthumously)

2014 

Date of ceremony: February 27, 2014, "Radio City Bar & Kitchen" club, Moscow.

Hosts: Igor Kraev, Zaza Napoli

Featured musicians: Nyusha, Mitya Fomin, A-Studio, Serebro, Nu Virgos, Gradusy, Vintage (band), DJ Smash, Roma Kenga, 30.02, Guru Groove Foundation.

Winners of Top Hit Music Awards Russia 2013:

Best Local male singer on the Radio
 Grigory Leps
Best Local female singer on the Radio
Nyusha
Eva Polna

The best local band on the radio
Gradusy 
Vintage (band)

Best international male singer on the Radio
Avicii
Pharrell Williams

Best international female singer on the Radio
 Pink

The best international band on the radio
Daft Punk

The most ordered local singer on the radio
Grigory Leps
Nyusha
Serebro

The most ordered international singer on the radio
 Pharrell Williams
 Pink

Song awards

Local Radio Hit of the Year (female vocals)
 "In private" ("Наедине") (Nyusha)

Local Radio Hit of the Year (male vocals)
 "I always remember the main thing" ("Я всегда помню о главном") (Gradusy band)

International Radio Hit of the Year (male vocals)
 "Get Lucky" (Daft Punk feat. Pharrell Williams)

International Radio Hit of the Year (female vocals)
 "Diamonds" (Rihanna)

The most ordered local song on the radio
 "I'm happy" ("Я счастливый") (Grigory Leps)
 "Not enough of you"  (Serebro)
 "In private" ("Наедине") (Nyusha)

The most ordered international song on the radio
"Lendo Calendo" (Dan Balan feat. Tany Vander & Brasco)
"Get Lucky" (Daft Punk feat. Pharrell Williams)
"Tu Me Manques" (Mia Martina)

Awards in special nominations

Radio Discovery of the Year
Pizza (Пицца)
30.02

Radio Breakthrough
A-Studio

Professional awards

Dmitry Dubinsky (author of the music in the song "I'm happy" ("Я счастливый") performed by Grigory Leps)
Yuri Parenko (author of the lyrics in the song "I'm happy" performed by Grigory Leps)
Roman Pashkov, Ruslan Tagiyev (authors of the song "I always remember the main thing" performed by the band Gradusy)
Olga Seryabkina (author of the song "Not enough of you" ("Мало тебя") performed by the band Serebro)
Sergey Prikazchikov (author of the song "Weapons" ("Оружие") performed by the Pizza band)
Alexander Khoroshkovaty (author of the song "Stars in puddles" ("Звёзды в лужах") performed by the band 30.02)

Producers of the Year
Vladimir and Oksana Shurochkina (singer Nyusha)
Alexander Nikitin (Grigory Leps)
Oleg Nekrasov (Gradusy band)
Alexey Romanov (Vintage (band))
Maxim Fadeev (Serebro band)
Anton Pronin (Pizza band)
Sergey Baldin (band 30.02)
Baigali Serkebaev (A-Studio band)

Labels of the Year
Universal Music Russia
Velvet Music
National Music Corporation
Pronin Management

Hall of fame:
Diskoteka Avariya

2015 

Date of ceremony: April 23, 2015, "Radio City Bar & Kitchen" club, Moscow.

Hosts: Timur Rodriguez, Yulia Kovalchuk.

Featured musicians: Yolka (singer), Serebro, Nyusha, Egor Kreed, MBAND, Anita Tsoy, 5’sta Family, Banderos, Nu Virgos, Vera Brezhneva, Vintage (band), Dasha Suvorova, Vakhtang, Burito, MakSim, Masha and Mowgli, Mayakovsky band, Pizza, Lexter.

Winners of Top Hit Music Awards Russia 2015:

Best Local male Singer on the Radio
Grigory Leps

Best Local female Singer on the Radio
Nyusha
Yolka (singer)

The best Local band on the radio
Nu Virgos 
Vintage (band)

Best international male Singer on the Radio
Calvin Harris

Best international female Singer on the Radio
Imany

The most ordered local singer on the radio
Serebro

Song awards

Local Radio Hit of the Year (female vocals)
 "I won't give you up" ("Я тебя не отдам") (Serebro)

Local Radio Hit of the Year (male vocals)
 "City of Big Lights" ("Город больших огней") (Dmitry Koldun)

Local Radio Hit of the Year (mixed vocals)
"You know" ("Ты знаешь") (Yolka feat.Burito)

International Radio Hit of the Year (male vocals)
"Am I Wrong" (Nico & Vinz)

International Radio Hit of the Year (female vocals)
"You Will Never Know" (Imany)

The most ordered local song on the radio
"I won't give you up" ("Я тебя не отдам") (Serebro)
"I got another one" ("У меня появился другой") ( Nu Virgos feat Vakhtang)

The most ordered international song on the radio
"Lendo Calendo" (Dan Balan feat. Tany Vander & Brasco)
"Get Lucky" (Daft Punk feat. Pharrell Williams)
"Tu Me Manques" (Mia Martina)

Awards in special nominations

Radio Discovery of the Year
Egor Kreed 
Masha and Mowgli
Mayakovsky band

Radio Comeback
Nu Virgos

Professional awards
Igor Burnyshev (author of the song "You Know" performed by Burito feat. Yolka (singer))
Maxim Fadeev (author of the song "I won't give you up" performed by the band Serebro)
Olga Seryabkina (author of the lyrics of the song "I won't give you up" performed by the band Serebro)
Dmitry Koldun (author of the song "City of Big Lights" performed by Dmitry Koldun)
Irina Sekacheva (author of the lyrics of the song "City of Big Lights" performed by Dmitry Koldun)
Konstantin Meladze (author of the song "I have Another one" performed by Nu Virgos feat. Vakhtang) Producers of the Year
Konstantin Meladze (Nu Virgos band)
Alexey Romanov (Vintage (band) band)
Anna Pletneva (Vintage band)
Maxim Fadeev (Serebro band)
Valery Belotserkovsky (Masha and Mowgli band)
Sergey Krasnenko (Mayakovsky band)
Vladimir and Oksana Shurochkina (singer Nyusha)

Labels of the Year
Sony Music Entertainment Russia
Universal Music Russia
Warner Music Russia
Black Star
Broma 16
Velvet Music

Hall of fame:
Yolka (singer), Alyona Mikhailova

2016 

Date of ceremony: April 28, 2016, Stereo Dome Club, Moscow.

The organizer of the III TopHit Music Awards Ceremony was the TopHit company.

Producer General: Igor Kraev

Executive Producer: Pavel Balashov

Hosts: Timur Rodriguez, Anna Semenovich.

Featured musicians: Yolka (singer),  Nyusha, Egor Kreed, MBAND, Anita Tsoy, 5’sta Family, Banderos, Nu Virgos, Vera Brezhneva, Vintage (band), Dasha Suvorova, Vakhtang, Burito, MakSim, Masha and Mowgli, Mayakovsky band, Pizza, Lexter.

Winners of Top Hit Music Awards Russia 2016:

Best Local male Singer on the Radio
Grigory Leps
Egor Kreed

Best Local female Singer on the Radio
Yolka (singer)

The best local band on the radio
Vintage (band) 
MBAND

Best international male Singer on the Radio
Robin Schulz

Best international female Singer on the Radio
Imany

The most ordered local singer on the radio
Nyusha
Vintage (band)

Best local Singer on YouTube Russia
Timati

The best local band on YouTube Russia
Serebro

Song awards

Local Radio Hit of the Year (female vocals)
"Tsunami" (Nyusha)

Local Radio Hit of the Year (male vocals)
"Mama" (Burito)
"You are the most" ("Самая-самая") (Egor Kreed)
"Don't be silent" ("Не молчи") (Dima Bilan)

Local Radio Hit of the Year (mixed vocals)
"There is nothing more to love" ("Любить больше нечем") (Jigan feat. Julia Savicheva)

International Radio Hit of the Year (male vocals)
"Are You With Me" (Lost Frequencies)

International Radio Hit of the Year (female vocals)
"The Good, The Bad And The Crazy" (Imany)

The best video clip YouTube Russia 
"You are the most" ("Самая-самая") (Egor Kreed)

Awards in special nominations

Radio Discovery of the Year
Burito
MBAND
Julianna Karaulova

Professional awards
Igor Burnyshev (author of the music and words in the song "Mama" performed by Burito)
Ilya Pale (the author of the verses in the song "Mama" performed by Burito)
Anna Shurochkina (author of the song "Tsunami" performed by singer Nyusha)
Mikhail Reshetnyak (the author of the music in the song "You are the most" ("Самая-Самая") performed by Egor Creed)
Egor Bulatkin (the author of the words in the song "You are the most" ("Самая-Самая")  performed by Egor Creed)

Producers of the Year
Alexey Romanov, Anna Pletneva (Vintage (band) band)
Maxim Fadeev (Serebro band, Yulia Savicheva)
Black Star (Egor Creed, Timati)
Alyona Mikhailova, Liana Meladze (singer Yolka (singer))
Konstantin Meladze (MBAND band)
Vladimir and Oksana Shurochkin (singer Nyusha)
Irina Shcherbinskaya (Julianna Karaulova)
Yana Rudkovskaya (Dima Bilan)

Labels of the Year
Black Star
Velvet Music
Warner Music Russia
Universal Music Russia
Sony Music Entertainment Russia

Hall of fame:
Sergey Lazarev, Sergey Shnurov, Arman Davletyarov / Muz-TV.

2017 

Date of the ceremony: March 16, 2017, Crocus City Hall, Moscow.

The organizer of the IV TopHit Music Awards Ceremony was the TopHit company and Volkov PRO.

Producer General: Igor Kraev

Producer: Maxim Volkov

Executive Producers: Pavel Balashov and Ksenia Kabisheva

Director of Photography: Grigory Skomorovsky

Hosts: Timur Rodriguez and Zlatoslava, Yulia Kovalchuk and Alexey Chumakov, Mitya Fomin and Anita Tsoy.

Featured musicians: Yolka (singer), Alekseev, Loboda, Elena Temnikova, Burito, MBAND, Anita Tsoy, Julianna Karaulova, Nu Virgos, Artik & Asti, Anna Pletneva, Gradusy, Eva Polna, Banderos, Slava (singer), Quest Pistols Show, Kristina Si. Sergey Shnurov, winner of the Top Hit Music Awards and a member of the TopHit Hall of Fame, and the Leningrad (band) band performed a solo set at the end of the ceremony.

Winners of Top Hit Music Awards Russia 2017:

Best Local male Singer on the Radio
Alekseev

Best Local female Singer on the Radio
Yolka (singer)
Julianna Karaulova
Loboda

The best Local band on the radio
Serebro

Best International male Singer on the Radio
Coldplay

Best International female Singer on the Radio
Sia

Song awards

Local Radio Hit of the Year (female vocals)
 "I'm warming happiness" ("Грею счастье") (Yolka (singer))

Local Radio Hit of the Year (male vocals)
 "Drunk sun" (Пьяное солнце) (Alekseev)

Awards in special nominations

Radio Discovery of the Year
Artik & Asti
Quest Pistols
Elena Temnikova
Kristina Si

YouTube Russia Awards:

Best Local male Singer on YouTube Russia
Egor Kreed
Timati

The best Local band on YouTube Russia
Leningrad (band)

The best Local video clip (female vocals)
"Exhibit" ("Экспонат") (Leningrad (band))

The best Local video clip (male vocals)
"Madwoman" ("Сумашедшая") ( Alexey Vorobyov)

The best Local video clip (mixed vocals)
"Name 505" ("Имя 505") ( Time and Glass band)

Professional awards
Egor Solodovnikov (the author of the music and words in the song "I'm warming happiness " ("Грею счастье") performed by Yolka (singer))
Ruslan Kvint (the author of the music in the song "Drunk Sun" ("Пьяное солнце") performed by Alekseev)
Vitaly Kurovsky (author of the words in the song "Drunk Sun" performed by Alekseev)
Sergey Shnurov (author of the song "Exhibit" ("Экспонат") performed by the Leningrad (band))
Alexey Vorobyov (author of the song " Madwoman" ("Сумашедшая") in his own performance)
Alexey Potapenko (author of the song "Name 505" performed by the band Time and Glass)

Producers of the Year
Sergey Shnurov (Leningrad (band) band)
Maxim Fadeev (Serebro band)
Alyona Mikhailova, Liana Meladze (singer Yolka (singer))
Irina Shcherbinskaya, Denis Sattarov (Julianna Karaulova)

Labels of the Year
Warner Music Russia
Sony Music Entertainment Russia
Effective Records
Black Star
Velvet Music

Hall of fame:
Andrey Makarevich/ Mashina Vremeni
Bi-2

2018 

Date of the ceremony: April 11, 2018, Yota Arena, Moscow.
The organizer of the IV TopHit Music Awards Ceremony was the TopHit company and Master Gallery.

Producers General: Igor Kraev and Anita Tsoy.

Executive Producers: Pavel Balashov.

Director of Photography: Anita Tsoy.

Broadcast Director: Vasily Klimov.

Hosts: Timur Rodriguez and Alexander Anatolyevich.

Featured musicians: Double Max, Burito, Estradarada, Elena Temnikova, Filatov & Karas, Vera Brezhneva, Artik & Asti, Gradusy, MBAND, Polina Gagarina, Going Deeper, Yolka (singer).

Winners of Top Hit Music Awards Russia 2018:

Radio

Singers awards

Best Local male Singer on the radio
Max Barskih

Best Local female Singer on the radio
Yolka (singer)
Loboda
The best Local band on the radio
Gradusy
Burito

Best International male Singer on the radio
David Guetta

Best International female Singer on the radio
Sia

The best International band on the radio
Imagine Dragons

Song awardsLocal radio Hit of the Year (female vocals)"Your eyes" ("Твои глаза") (Loboda)Local radio Hit of the Year (male vocals)"Fogs" ("Туманы") (Max Barskih)Local radio Hit of the Year (mixed vocals)"Undivided" ("Неделимы") (Artik & Asti)International radio Hit (male vocals)"Shape Of You" (Ed Sheeran)International radio Hit (mixed vocals)"Kissing Strangers" (DNCE feat Nicki Minaj)Awards in special nominationsRadio BreakthroughGradusyFonMix Artist of the YearPolina GagarinaThe Best Remix ProducersGoing DeeperYouTube Russia AwardsYouTube Discovery of the YearMushrooms (Грибы)Best Local male Singer on YouTube RussiaEgor KreedBest Local female Singer on YouTube RussiaLobodaThe best Local band on YouTube RussiaTime and GlassThe best Local video clip (female vocals)"Exhibit" ("Экспонат") (Leningrad (band))The best Local video clip (male vocals)"Madwoman" ("Сумашедшая") (Alexey Vorobyov)The best Local video clip (mixed vocals)"Name 505" ("Имя 505") (Time and Glass band)Best International male Singer on YouTube RussiaPsyBest International female Singer on YouTube RussiaC. C. CatchThe best International band on YouTube RussiaSkilletThe best video clip on YouTube Russia AwardsThe best Local video clip (female vocals)"Lyrics" (Filatov & Karas feat. Masha)The best Local video clip (male vocals)"Ice melts" ("Тает лёд") (Mushrooms)The best Local video clip (mixed vocals)"On the style" ("На стиле") (Time and Glass band)Professional awardsGrib, Daniil Dudulad, Evgeny Yaremenko, Ilya Kapustin (author of the song "Ice Melts" (Тает лёд) by the band Mushrooms)
Alexey Potapenko, Alexey Zavgorodny (the authors of the song "On style" (На стиле) performed by the band Time and Glass)
Igor Burnyshev (author of the song "On the Waves" (По волнам) performed by Burito)
Max Barskikh (author of the song "Fogs" (Туманы) performed by Max Barskih)
Artem Umrikhin, Dmitry Lebedev (authors of the song "Indivisible" (Неделимы) performed by Artik & Asti)
Loboda, Igor Maysky, Rita Dakota (authors of the song "Your Eyes" performed by Loboda)
Egor Solodovnikov (author of the music and words in the song "Let the music in" (Впусти музыку) performed by Yolka (singer))Producers of the YearAlyona Mikhailova, Liana Meladze (singer Yolka (singer))Labels of the YearVelvet Music
Warner Music Russia
Universal Music Russia
Effective RecordsHall of fameYuri Shevchuk/ DDT (band)
Leonid Agutin.

 2019 

Date of the ceremony: April 10, 2019, Crocus City Hall, Moscow.

The organizer of the IV TopHit Music Awards Ceremony was the TopHit company and Volkov PRO.

Producer General: Igor Kraev

Producer: Maxim Volkov

Executive Producers: Pavel Balashov and Ksenia Kabisheva

Director of Photography: Grigory Skomorovsky

Broadcast Director: Vasily Klimov

Hosts: Timur Rodriguez and Albina Dzhanabaeva

The host of the online broadcast: Alexander Anatolyevich

Featured musicians: DJ Groove, Yolka, Nu Virgos, Valery Meladze, MBAND,  A'Studio & The Jigits, Slava, Gradusy, Rasa, Grivina, Mari Kraimbrery, Zvonkiy, Burito, Nyusha and Dima Bilan performed a solo set at the end of the ceremony.

Winners of Top Hit Music Awards Russia 2019:

Radio awardsSingers awardsBest Local male Singer on the radio Valery MeladzeBest Local female Singer on the radio Yolka
 LobodaThe best Local band on the radio LyubeBest International male Singer on the radioCalvin Harris
Jax JonesBest International female Singer on the radioSiaThe best International band on the radioImagine DragonsSong awardsLocal radio Hit of the Year (female vocals)"Night" ("Ночь") (Nyusha)Local radio Hit of the Year (male vocals)"Strokes" ("Штрихи") (Burito)International Radio Hit (female vocals)"Breath" (Jax Jones feat. Ina Wroldsen)International Radio Hit (male vocals)"Hands Up" (Merk & Kremont feat. DNCE)International Radio Hit (mixed vocals)"In My Mind" (Dynoro feat. Gigi D'Agostino)Awards in special nominationsRadio discovery MaruvRadio breakthrough SlavaRadio comeback Dmitry Malikov

YouTube Russia AwardsBest Local male Singer on YouTube Russia Egor KreedBest Local female Singer on YouTube RussiaLoboda
Polina GagarinaThe best Local band on YouTube RussiaTime and GlassBest International male Singer on YouTube RussiaDaddy YankeeBest International female Singer on YouTube RussiaKaty PerryThe best International band on YouTube RussiaImagine DragonsThe best video clip on YouTube Russia AwardsThe best Local video clip of the Year"Skibidi" (Little Big)The best Local video clip (female vocals)"I want" ("Я хочу") (Grivina)The best Local video clip (male vocals)"Medusa" (Matrang)The best International video clip (male vocals)"Despacito" (Luis Fonsi feat. Daddy Yankee)The best International video clip (female vocals)"Plakala" KazkaYouTube Discovery of the YearMatrang
HammAli & NavaiYouTube breakthrough of the YearLittle BigYouTube Comeback of the YearPhilipp KirkorovAwards in special nominationsFonMix Artist of the YearDominic Joker
GradusyThe Battle of fan clubs WinnerDima BilanProfessional awardsAuthors of the Year Konstantin Meladze (author of more than 200 hits performed by Valery Meladze, Vera Brezhneva, Nu Virgos, MBAND, which were performed more than 6.7 million times on the Russian radio in 2018)The Authors of the Hits of the YearNyusha (author of the song "Night" ("Ночь") performed by Nyusha)
Igor Burnyshev, Andrey Lyskov, Vladimir Krylov (authors of the song "Strokes" ("Штрихи") performed by Burito)
Ilya Prusikin, Lyubim Khomchuk (authors of the song "Skibidi" performed by Little Big)
Alan Hadzaragov, Garegin Tamrazyan (authors of the song "Medusa" performed by Matrang)
Denis Gaziev, Farhad Veisov (authors of the song "I want" ("Я хочу") performed by Grivina)Producers of the YearNatella Krapivina (Loboda)
Konstantin Meladze (Valery Meladze)
Alyona Mikhailova, Liana Meladze (Yolka, Burito)
Igor Matvienko (Lyube)Labels of the YearWarner Music Russia
Universal Music Russia
Effective Records
Velvet MusicHall of fameYuri Antonov
Polina Gagarina

2020

Due to the COVID-19 pandemic, the VIII Top Hit Music Awards Russia ceremony, which was scheduled for April 2020, was canceled. All awards to artists, authors, producers, record labels were sent by the organizers to the offices of the laureates.

Radio awardsSingers awardsBest Local male Singer on the radioValery Meladze
Max Barskih
Dima BilanBest Local female Singer on the RadioLobodaThe best Local band on the radioRuki Vverh!
Artik & AstiBest International male Singer on the RadioCalvin HarrisBest International female Singer on the RadioMaruvThe best International band on the radioImagine DragonsSong awardsLocal radio Hit of the Year (female vocals) "Instadrama" (Loboda)Local radio Hit of the Year (male vocals)"Voices" ("Голоса") (Zvonkiy)Local Radio Hit (mixed vocals)"Sad Dance" ("Грустный Дэнс") (Артём Качер feat. Artik & Asti)International Radio Hit (female vocals)"Bad Guy" (Billie Eilish)International radio Hit (male vocals)"Shameless" (Denis First & Reznikov & Bright Sparks)International Radio Hit (mixed vocals)"Seniorita" (Shawn Mendes & Camila Cabello)Awards in special nominationsRadio discoveryFilatov & Karas

YouTube Russia AwardsBest Local male Singer on YouTube RussiaArthur PirozhkovBest Local female Singer on YouTube RussiaZivertThe best Local band on YouTube RussiaLittle BigBest International male Singer on YouTube RussiaXXXTentacionBest International female Singer on YouTube RussiaBillie EilishThe best International band on YouTube RussiaBTSAwards in special nominationsFonMix Artist of the YearZivertProfessional awardsAuthors of the YearKonstantin Meladze (author of more than 200 hits performed by Valery Meladze, Vera Brezhneva, Nu Virgos, MBAND, which were performed more than 6.6 million times on the Russian radio in 2019)The Authors of the Hits of the Year 
Andrey Frolov (author of the song "Instadrama" performed by Loboda)
Dmitry Loren (author of the song "Sad Dance" ("Грустный дэнс") performed by Artik & Asti feat. Artem Kacher)
Artem Umrikhin (author of the poems "Sad Dance" performed by Artik & Asti feat. Artem Kacher)
Ilya Prusikin (author of the song "Skibidi" performed by Little Big)
Lyubim Khomchuk (author of the song "Skibidi" performed by Little Big)
Denis Kovalsky (author of the song "Hooked" ("Зацепила") performed by Artur Pirozhkov)
2MASHI (the authors of the song "Mama I Dance" ("Мама, я танцую") performed by 2MASHI)Producers of the YearNatella Krapivina (Loboda)
Konstantin Meladze (Valery Meladze)
Alyona Mikhailova, Liana Meladze (Yolka, Burito)
Igor Matvienko (Lyube)Labels of the YearWarner Music Russia
Universal Music Russia
Effective Records
Velvet MusicHall of fameLoboda

2021

Date of the ceremony: April 19, 2021, Madison Restaurant & Club, Moscow.

The organizer of the IV TopHit Music Awards Ceremony was the TopHit company and Vsegda Krasivo (Всегда Красиво).

Producer General: Igor Kraev

Producers: Pavel Balashov, Lisa BI-2

Executive Producers: Yulia Vlasova

Director of Photography: Olga Slobodskaya

Broadcast Director: Vasily Klimov

Hosts: Timur Rodriguez and Angelika Pushnova

The host of the online broadcast: Dmitry Nesterov

Featured musicians: Yolka, Dabro, Mari Kraimbrery , Habib, Vanya Dmitrienko, Nu Virgos, Filatov & Karas, Cobain Jackets (Куртки Кобейна)

Winners of Top Hit Music Awards Russia 2021:

RadioSingers awardsBest Local male Singer on the radioMax BarskihBest Local female Singer on the radioZivertThe best Local band on the radioRuki Vverh!
Artik & AstiBest International male Singer on the RadioThe WeekndBest International female Singer on the RadioDua LipaThe best International band on the radioThe Black Eyed PeasSong awardsLocal Radio Hit of the Year (female vocals)"ILY" ("ЯТЛ") (Zivert)Local Radio Hit of the Year (male vocals) "Lei, ne zhalei" (Max Barskih)Local Radio Hit (mixed vocals) "Girl dance" ("Девочка танцуй") (Artik & Asti)International Radio Hit (female vocals)"All Good Things" (NRD1)
"Salt" (Ava Max)International Radio Hit (male vocals)"Blinding Lights" (The Weeknd)Awards in special nominationsRadio discoveryDabroRadio BreakthroughKlava Koka

YouTube Russia AwardsBest Local male Singer on YouTube RussiaNiletto
MorgenshternBest Local female Singer on YouTube RussiaKlava KokaThe best Local band on YouTube RussiaLittle BigBest International male Singer on YouTube Russia6ix9ineBest International female Singer on YouTube RussiaTones and IThe best International band on YouTube RussiaBTSThe best video clip on YouTube Russia AwardsThe best Local video clip of the Year"Uno" (Little Big)The best Local video clip (female vocals)"Left the chat" ("Покинула чат") (Klava Koka)The best Local video clip (male vocals)"Lyubimka" (Niletto)The best International video clip (female vocals)"Dance Monkey" (Tones and I)
"How You Like That" BLACKPINKAwards in special nominationsFonMix Artist of the YearMari KraimbreryProfessional awardsAuthors of the YearKonstantin Meladze (author of more than 200 hits performed by Valery Meladze, Vera Brezhneva, Nu Virgos, MBAND, which were performed more than 6.6 million times on the Russian radio in 2020)
Ilya Prusikin (the author of the songs/clips that received the most views on YouTube Russia in 2020)The Authors of the Hits of the YearMax Barskikh (author of the song "Ley, ne zhaley"("Лей, не жалей") performed by Max Barskikh)
Claudia Vysokova, Alexander Mikheev, Konstantin Koksharov (the authors of the song "Left the chat" ("Покинула чат") performed by Klava Kok)
Ilya Prusikin, Denis Zuckerman, Viktor Sibrinin (authors of the song "Uno" performed by Little Big)
Danil Prytkov, Andrey Popov (authors of the song "Lyubimka" performed by Niletto)
Artem Umrikhin, Dmitry Loren (authors of the song "Girl Dance" ("Девочка танцуй") performed by Artik & Asti)
Ivan Zasidkevich, Mikhail Zasidkevich (authors of the songs "Youth" ("Юность"), "On the Roof"("На крыше") performed by the Dabro group)Producers of the YearNatella Krapivina (Loboda)
Konstantin Meladze (Valery Meladze, Vera Brezhneva, Nu Virgos, MBAND)
Alyona Mikhailova, Liana Meladze (Yolka, Burito)
Igor Matvienko (Lyube)Labels of the YearWarner Music Russia
Universal Music Russia
Effective Records
Velvet MusicHall of fameSergey Zhukov, musician and songwriter of band Ruki Vverh!
Vladimir Presnyakov Jr. musician
Igor Krutoy composer and producer.

 2022 

Due to 2022 Russian invasion of Ukraine, the X ceremony of the Top Hit Music Awards Russia, which was scheduled for April 2022, was canceled.

Awards to artists, authors, producers and record labels were sent by the organizers of the award to the offices of the laureates during 2022.

In 2022, TopHit for the first time (and the only time so far) presented awards to artists and hits most often listened to by users of the Spotify streaming platform in Russia.

Winners of Top Hit Music Awards Russia 2021:

RadioSingers awardsBest Local male Singer on the RadioDima BilanBest Local female Singer on the RadioZivertThe best Local band on the radioArtik & AstiBest International male Singer on the RadioThe WeekndBest International female Singer on the RadioInnaThe best International band on the radioImagine DragonsSong awardsLocal Radio Hit of the Year (female vocals)"Ellipsises" ("Многоточия") (Zivert)Local Radio Hit of the Year (male vocals)"Venus–Jupiter" (Vanya Dmitrienko)Local Radio Hit (mixed vocals)"Bestseller" (Макс Барских & Zivert)International Radio Hit (female vocals)"3 To 1" (Monoir feat. Eneli)International Radio Hit (male vocals)"Your Love (9pm)" (ATB & Topic & A7S)Awards in special nominationsRadio discoveryImanbek

YouTube Russia AwardsBest Local male Singer on YouTube RussiaHabibBest Local female Singer on YouTube RussiaMia BoykaThe best Local band on YouTube RussiaDabroBest International male Singer on YouTube RussiaLil Nas XBest International female Singer on YouTube RussiaMinelliThe best International band on YouTube RussiaBTSThe best video clip on YouTube Russia AwardsThe best Local video clip (mixed vocals)"Pikachu" ("Пикачу") (Mia Boyka & Egor Ship)The best Local video clip (male vocals)"Berry-raspberry" ("Ягода-Малинка") (Хабиб)The best Local video clip (female vocals)"Dear" ("Родной") (Loboda)The best International video clip (female vocals)"Dance Monkey" (Tones and I)YouTube Discovery of the YearSultan Laguchev
Instasamka
Galibri & MavikYouTube Breakthrough of the YearJah Khalib
Ruki Vverh!

Spotify RussiaSingers awardsBest Local male Singer on Spotify RussiaBig Baby Tape
KizaruBest Local female Singer on Spotify RussiaInstasamka
Best Local Band on Spotify Russia
Poshlaya MollyBest International male Singer on Spotify RussiaLil Nas XBest International female Singer on Spotify RussiaDoja CatThe best International band on Spotify RussiaMåneskinSongs awardsThe best Local hit (male vocals)"Déjà vu" ("Дежавю") (Kizaru)The best Local hit (female vocals)"Malchik na devyatke" ("Мальчик на девятке") (Dead Blonde)Professional awardsAuthors of the YearKonstantin Meladze (author of more than 200 hits performed by Valery Meladze, Vera Brezhneva, Nu Virgos, MBAND, which were performed more than 6.2 million times on the Russian radio in 2021)Authors of the Hits of the YearAlexander Fomenkov, Rahman Sharipov, Evgeny Trukhin (authors of the song "Berry Raspberry" ("Ягода-Малинка") performed by Habib)
Ivan Dmitrienko, Artem Shapovalov (authors of the song "Venus-Jupiter" ("Венера-Юпитер") performed by Vanya Dmitrienko)
Samvel Vardyanyan, Julia Zivert, Bogdan Leonovich (authors of the song "Dots" ("Многоточия") performed by Zivert)
Nikolai Bortnik, Julia Sievert (authors of the song "Bestseller" performed by Max Barsky)
Ivan Zasidkevich, Mikhail Zasidkevich (the authors of the songs "On the clock zero-zero" ("На часах ноль-ноль"), "The whole district will hear" ("Услышит весь район") performed by the band DaBro)
Maria Boyka, Alexander Mikheev, Konstantin Koshkarev, Egor Korablin (authors of the song "Pikachu" performed by Mia Boyka & Egor Ship)
Artem Umrikhin, Dmitry Loren (authors of the song "Hysterical"("Истеричка") performed by Artik & Asti)
Dmitry Loren (author of the song "Dear" ("Родной") performed by Loboda)Producers of the Year Yana Rudkovskaya (performer Dima Bilan)
"Ellipsises" ("Многоточия") (Zivert)
Artem Umrikhin (Artik & Asti group)
Alexander Fomenkov, Evgeny Trukhin (performed by Habib and Galibri & Mavik)
Alisher Morgenstern (Morgenshtern)
Alyona Mikhailova, Liana Meladze (Yolka, Mari Kraimbreri)Labels of the YearWarner Music Russia
The Mikhail Gutseriev PC
Effective Records

Hall of fameShort list'
Artik & Asti
Burito
Filatov & Karas
Zivert
Andrey Gubin
Basta
Boris Grebenshchikov / Aquarium
Diana Arbenina / Night Snipers
Evgeny Khavtan / Bravo
Zvonkiy
Ilya Lagutenko / Mummy Troll
Max Barskikh

References

Website 
 

Russian music awards